Woore is a village and civil parish in the north east of Shropshire, England, of about 3,950 acres (1,600 hectares). It had a population of 1,004 in the 2001 Census, rising to 1,069 at the 2011 Census.

Etymology

The name means "boundary" in ancient Celtic or Anglo-Saxon ("Oure"), and this fits nicely with the fact that it is on the boundary with both the counties of Cheshire and Staffordshire. The parish is the most northerly in Shropshire.

Location
The civil parish includes several other hamlets and villages including Gravenhunger, Dorrington, Pipe Gate, Bearstone, part of Onneley (the remainder being in the neighbouring Staffordshire Parish of Madeley) and Ireland's Cross.

The nearest significant towns to Woore are Market Drayton, Whitchurch, Newcastle-under-Lyme, Nantwich and Crewe. The A51 and A525 roads run through the village, the A51 being the old London - Chester post road. (Changes of horses used to be available at the former Swan Inn, now flats, in the centre of Woore itself.) The only road links between Woore and the rest of Shropshire pass through adjoining counties. The village is also the farthest place in Shropshire from the centre of the county near Cantlop.

History
The Domesday Book  (1086) entry for Woore (“Waure”) shows that the manor was held not from Earl Roger of Shrewsbury, but as a tenant-in-chief from the King, by William Malbedeng (William Malbank), and contained a large hall within the moated site at what is now Syllenhurst Farm. Lying in the Hundred of Hodnet, there were 5 households in Woore itself, the value of which to the Lord was assessed for tax at 5 shillings, with woodland for 60 pigs. William Malbank also held land at Dorrington (2 households with land for 3 ploughlands, woodland for 100 pigs, valued at 4 shillings), Gravenhunger (2 households with land for 4 ploughlands, valued at 6 shillings) and Onneley (no households, valued at less than 2 shillings).  He had succeeded a pre-Conquest Saxon Lord, Edric. In later medieval times the most notable family of Woore was the de Bulkeleys.

Racecourse

The village had a National Hunt racecourse until 1963, served by Pipe Gate railway station in the south of the parish, which was closed under the Beeching "Axe".

Modern day
Bridgemere Garden World is to the north of Woore, just over the border in Cheshire.

The village today is mostly residential with a number of small shops, centred on the Post Office and general stores on the village square. Two public houses service the village, along with one modern red brick primary school and two churches, the smaller of which is a Methodist church, popularly known as "the Chapel on the corner", and the larger of which is St. Leonard's Church of England parish church.

The parish council has 10 elected members, and normally meets monthly, on the first Monday of the month.

Woore Cricket Club play at the Falcon Field in the village, which slopes downwards dramatically from the Pavilion and Falcon Inn sides.

St Leonard's Church
St. Leonard's church was constructed in about 1830-31, to serve what were then five townships of the Shropshire portion of the ancient parish of Mucklestone in Staffordshire, and is of an unconventional white plaster Italianate design. A Grade II listed building, it was repainted in 2011. Designed by George Hamilton of Stone, the bell tower is an Edwardian addition by Chapman and Snape of Newcastle-under-Lyme. The tower has not been safe to regularly ring in since the late 1980s, with the bells now replaced by a timed recording. The churchyard contains a war grave of a British soldier of World War I.

Transport
Woore no longer has bus services as it was previously served by a bus connecting the village with Hanley and Nantwich, however the service ceased in 2015. Now the nearby village of Buerton has bus links to Nantwich, Whitchurch (Shropshire) and Audlem. The other is the village of Madeley (Staffordshire) which provides links to Newcastle-Under-Lyme, Crewe and Stoke-on-Trent.

There was no railway station in Woore but there was a station in the village of Pipe Gate which was on the now-closed Stoke-Market Drayton Line. The station closed in 1957 along with the section to Market Drayton but the line from Silverdale to Pipe Gate remained open to serve both a creamery and as a loop back to the mainline at Madeley Chord until 1998 when the entire line closed after closure of Silverdale Colliery. The line has been mothballed and the bridge demolished. The station master's house survives as a private residence but the station site is now a timber yard. Part of the embankment is still present but the section towards Market Drayton is built on by a new housing development. This does not however hinder possible future proposals for reopening of the line.

Notable residents
 William Bridges Adams (1797 in Woore – 1872) author, locomotive engineer and inventor of the Adams axle
 Albert Lightfoot (born 1936 in Woore) a cricketer for Northamptonshire
 John Lawton (1936 in Woore – 2017) footballer, played 9 games for Stoke City F.C
 Nick Hancock (born 1962) TV personality owned a £1.1m mansion near Woore

See also
Listed buildings in Woore

Notes and references

External links

Villages in Shropshire
Extremities of Shropshire
Civil parishes in Shropshire